Superman: Doomsday & Beyond, also known as Superman Lives!, is a licensed novel, published in 1993, set in the DC Comics universe, written by Louise Simonson, and with illustrations from Dan Jurgens and José Luis García-López. It is a young-adult version of The Death of Superman comics storyline from 1992. An audio adaptation of the storyline, using the same title, aired on BBC Radio 1 also in 1993, which was released on audio cassette in 1993 and CD in 2005.

Source material
The book draws upon events from the following:

 Man of Steel #1-6 (limited series, 1986)
 Superman #73-82 (1992–93)
 Action Comics #683-692 (1992–93)
 Superman: The Man of Steel #17-26 (1992–93)
 Adventures of Superman #496-505 (1992–93)

Editions
Superman: Doomsday & Beyond (paperback), Bantam Books

Voice cast
Stuart Milligan as Kal-El/Clark Kent / Superman
William Hootkins as Lex Luthor
Lorelei King as Lois Lane
Vincent Marzello as Jimmy Olsen
Garrick Hagon as Perry White
Shelley Thompson as Lana Lang
Dick Vosburgh as Jor-El
Barbara Barnes as Lucy Lane
David Graham as Fisher
Simon Treves as Metallo
Elizabeth Mansfield as Amanda McCoy
Burt Kwouk as Doctor Teng
Jon Pertwee as Schwarz
Leon Herbert as John Henry Irons

References

Superman novels
1993 novels
Superman radio series
British radio dramas
BBC Radio 1 programmes
BBC Radio 4 programmes
BBC Radio dramas
1993 radio programme debuts
1993 radio programme endings